Mount French is a  summit in the Spray Mountains range of the Canadian Rockies in Alberta, Canada. The mountain is situated in  Peter Lougheed Provincial Park of Kananaskis Country. French is the second highest point in the Spray Mountains Range. Its nearest higher peak, and highest in the Spray Range, is Mount Sir Douglas,  to the west. Mount French can be seen from Alberta Highway 742, the Smith-Dorrien/Spray Trail.

History

It was named in 1915 by Morrison P. Bridgland (1878-1948), a Dominion Land Surveyor after Sir John French (1852-1925). French was Commander-in-chief of the British Forces (1914-1915) during the first 16 months of World War I, and in 1922 he was named the first Earl of Ypres.

The first ascent was made in 1921 by M. Morton Jr. and H.S. Hall Jr., with Edward Feuz Jr. as guide.

The mountain's name was officially adopted in 1924 by the Geographical Names Board of Canada.

Geology

Mount French is composed of sedimentary rock laid down during the Precambrian to Jurassic periods. Formed in shallow seas, this sedimentary rock was pushed east and over the top of younger rock during the Laramide orogeny. The French Glacier resides immediately west of the peak. The Haig Glacier, largest singular glacier in Kananaskis Country, lies to the south. The Smith-Dorrien Glacier is situated on the east side of Mount French.

Climate

Based on the Köppen climate classification, Mount French is located in a subarctic climate with cold, snowy winters, and mild summers.

See also
List of mountains in the Canadian Rockies
Scrambles in the Canadian Rockies, Alan Kane, 3rd edition, page 139

Notes

References

External links
 Mount French weather: Mountain Forecast
 Mount French climbing photos: Expor8ion.com

Three-thousanders of Alberta
Alberta's Rockies